The Tarikh-i-Kashmir (History of Kashmir) refers to several history books of Kashmir's Sultanate period, some of them lost and partially used as sources for the others.

Lost sources
Earlier lost sources include;
 History of Mullah Ahmad Kashmiri (lost)
 History of Mullah Nadiri (lost)

Use of Mullah Nadiri in Ahmadi texts
The Ahmadi writer Khwaja Nazir Ahmad in his advocacy of evidence for Jesus in India (1952) produced a photograph of a page in a folio he had tried to purchase in 1946 which he identified as being from Mullah Nadri. The folio is now lost and no identification of the document had been made by academic sources. 

Nazir Ahmad speculates that the Hindu text mentioned in the text in the 1946 photograph identifying Yuz Asaf with Jesus might have been the Bhavishya Purana. However that part of the text of the Bhavishya Purana dates from the British colonial era and does not mention Yuz Asaf, only Jesus and Mohammed.

Surviving histories
The surviving contemporary histories of the Sultanate are:
 Tarikh-i-Kashmir by Sayyid Ali completed in 1579;
 Tarikh-i-Kashmir by an anonymous writer (Aumer 287) written in 1590;
 Baharistan-i-Shahi, also anonymous, written in the time of Jahangir; 
 Tarikh-i-Kashmir by Hasan b. Ali Kashmiri also written in the time of Jahangir; 
 Tarikh-i-Kashmir by Haidar Malik Chaduara completed in 1620–21.
Other histories of Kashmir are eighteenth and nineteenth century abridgements of the above works.

References

History of Kashmir
History books about India
Historiography of India
15th-century Indian books
16th-century Indian books
17th-century Indian books
Indian chronicles
Jesus in Islam
Swoon hypothesis